Roy Pieters  (born ) is a Dutch male track cyclist, representing Netherlands at international competitions. He competed at the 2016 UEC European Track Championships in the team pursuit.

References

1989 births
Living people
Dutch male cyclists
Dutch track cyclists
Sportspeople from Haarlem
Cyclists from North Holland
20th-century Dutch people
21st-century Dutch people